Badiozzaman Forouzanfar or Badi'ozzamān Forūzānfar (also Romanized as "Badiʿ al-Zamān Furūzānfar") (12 July 1904 in Boshrooyeh in Ferdows County – 6 May 1970 in Tehran) (born Ziyaa' Boshrooye-i ) was a scholar of Persian literature, Iranian linguistics and culture, and an expert on Rumi (Molana Jalaleddin Balkhi) and his works. He was a distinguished professor of literature at Tehran University.

He is one of the "Five-Masters (Panj Ostād), five influential scholars of Persian literature, the others being Malekoshoara Bahar, Jalal Homaei, Abdolazim Gharib and Rashid Yasemi.

The critical edition of Rumi's Diwan-e Shams-e Tabrizi (in 10 volumes) by Forouzanfar is the best edition of the book available to date. The first critical edition of Fihi ma fihi was also  done by B. Forouzanfar, which is now well known in the West thanks to the selective translation of A. J. Arberry. His Ahadith-i Mathnawi is a compilation of hadith from Rumi's Masnavi.

He was also a first cousin (maternal) of another famous Iranian scholar of literature, Professor Mohammad Parvin Gonabadi.

Notable students 

 Mehrdad Avesta
 Parviz Natel Khanlari
 Zabihollah Safa
 Ehsan Yarshater
 Abdolhossein Zarrinkoub
 Amir Hossein Aryanpour
 Mohammad-Amin Riahi
 Simin Daneshvar
 Mohammad-Reza Shafiei-Kadkani
 Mohammad-Ali Eslami Nodooshan
 Ja'far Shahidi
 Jalal Matini
 William Chittick

See also 
 Persian literature
 Rumi (Molana)
 Five-Masters

References 

Iranian literary scholars
Linguists from Iran
Academic staff of the University of Tehran
People from Ferdows County
1970 deaths
1904 births
Members of the Academy of Persian Language and Literature
Forouzanfar
Iranian biographers
Iranian lexicographers
20th-century linguists
Researchers of Persian literature
20th-century lexicographers